Radical 74 or radical moon meaning "moon" or "month" is one of the 34 Kangxi radicals (214 radicals in total) composed of 4 strokes.

In the Kangxi Dictionary. there are 69 characters (out of 49,030) to be found under this radical.

 is also the 88th indexing component in the Table of Indexing Chinese Character Components predominantly adopted by Simplified Chinese dictionaries published in mainland China. Character with the alternative form of Kangxi Radical 130 ( "meat") is merged to this radical in Simplified Chinese, and no associated indexing component is left after the merger.

Evolution

Derived characters

Literature

External links

Unihan Database - U+6708

074
088